The Sima Power Station  is a hydroelectric power station located in the municipality Eidfjord in Vestland, Norway. It stands at the mouth of the Sima River. Operator is Statkraft.

See also

References 

Hydroelectric power stations in Norway
Statkraft
Buildings and structures in Vestland
Dams in Norway
Eidfjord